Tongues of Flame is a 1924 American silent melodrama film produced by Famous Players-Lasky and distributed through Paramount Pictures. It is based on a novel by Peter Clark MacFarlane and was directed by Joseph Henabery. The film starred Thomas Meighan and Bessie Love. It was produced by Famous Players-Lasky and distributed by Paramount Pictures.

Plot
The Native American Siwash people have been displaced from their land and live on a reservation. Wealthy Boland (Churchill) attempts to buy the reservation from the Siwash, who consult honest attorney Harrington (Meighan) for advice. Harrington looks into the contract and advises the Siwash to accept it. However, after the sale goes through, Boland drills for oil on the land, violating the contract. This angers Harrington, who exposes Boland's fraud. In retaliation, Boland has Harrington arrested on false charges.

A local court looks into the surveys associated with Boland's contracts, and returns all the Siwash native lands to them. Harrington is released from prison, and falls in love with the Siwash schoolteacher Lahleet (Love).

Cast

Production
The picture was filmed at Great Neck and Manhasset Bay on Long Island, New York.

Reception
The film received generally negative reviews, although Bessie Love's performance was praised.

Preservation
With no prints of Tongues of Flame located in any film archives, it is a lost film.

See also
 Whitewashing in film

References

External links 

 
 
 
 
 
 Posters and film stills

1924 drama films
1924 lost films
1924 films
American black-and-white films
Silent American drama films
American silent feature films
Famous Players-Lasky films
Films about Native Americans
Films based on American novels
Films directed by Joseph Henabery
Lost American films
Melodrama films
Lost drama films
1920s American films